The 1985 All-Big Ten Conference football team consists of American football players chosen as All-Big Ten Conference players for the 1985 Big Ten Conference football season.

Running back Lorenzo White and linebacker Larry Station were the only players unanimously selected as first-team players on all 20 ballots submitted by the members of the Associated Press (AP) media panel. Defensive end Mike Hammerstein followed with 19 first-team votes.  In the UPI balloting among conference coaches, Illinois wide receiver David Williams received the most votes, having been named to the first team by nine of the conference's ten coaches. In the UPI voting, Iowa's Chuck Long edged Jim Everett by one vote for the first-team quarterback position.

The Iowa Hawkeyes won the Big Ten championship and led the conference with eight first-team players, including quarterback Chuck Long and linebacker Larry Station.  The Michigan Wolverines led the nation in scoring defense and placed six players on the first-team units, including defensive linemen Mike Hammerstein and Mark Messner and linebacker Mike Mallory.

Offensive selections

Quarterbacks
 Chuck Long, Iowa (AP-1; UPI-1)
 Jim Everett, Purdue (AP-2; UPI-2)

Running backs
 Lorenzo White, Michigan State (AP-1; UPI-1)
 Ronnie Harmon, Iowa (AP-1; UPI-1)
 Rodney Carter, Purdue (AP-2; UPI-1)
 Larry Emery, Wisconsin (AP-2; UPI-2)
 George Cooper, Ohio State (UPI-2)
 Bobby Howard, Indiana (UPI-2)

Centers
 Bob Maggs, Ohio State (AP-1; UPI-1)
 Ray Hitchcock, Minnesota (AP-2; UPI-2)

Guards
 Jim Juriga, Illinois (AP-1; UPI-1)
 John Wojciechowski, Michigan State (AP-1; UPI-2)
 Bob Landsee, Wisconsin (AP-2; UPI-1)
 Jon Lilleberg, Minnesota (AP-2)
 Tom Humphrey, Iowa (UPI-2)

Tackles
 Mike Haight, Iowa (AP-1; UPI-1)
 Clay Miller, Michigan (AP-1; UPI-2)
 Rory Graves, Ohio State (AP-2; UPI-1)
 Steve Bogdalek, Michigan State (AP-2)
 Bob Riley, Indiana (UPI-2)

Tight ends
 Eric Kattus, Michigan (AP-1; UPI-2 [WR])
 Mike Flagg, Iowa (AP-2)

Receivers
 David Williams, Illinois (AP-1; UPI-1)
 Cris Carter, Ohio State (AP-1; UPI-1)
 Bill Happel, Iowa (AP-2; UPI-2)
 Kenny Allen, Indiana (AP-2)

Defensive selections

Defensive linemen
 Jeff Drost, Iowa (AP-1; UPI-1)
 Mike Hammerstein, Michigan (AP-1; UPI-1)
 Hap Peterson, Iowa (AP-1; UPI-1)
 Mark Messner, Michigan (AP-1; UPI-2)
 Guy Teafatiller, Illinois (AP-2; UPI-1)
 Eric Kumerow, Ohio State (AP-2; UPI-2)
 Tim Jordan, Wisconsin (AP-2)
 Larry Joyner, Minnesota (AP-2)
 Billy Harris, Michigan (UPI-2)
 Kelly Quinn, Michigan State (UPI-2)

Linebackers
 Pepper Johnson, Ohio State (AP-1; UPI-1)
 Mike Mallory, Michigan (AP-1; UPI-1)
 Chris Spielman, Ohio State (AP-1; UPI-1)
 Larry Station, Iowa (AP-1; UPI-1)
 Shane Bullough, Michigan State (AP-2; UPI-2)
 Andy Moeller, Michigan (AP-2; UPI-2)
 Peter Najarian, Minnesota (AP-2; UPI-2)
 Craig Raddatz, Wisconsin (AP-2)
 Mark Tagart, Illinois (UPI-2)

Defensive backs
 Brad Cochran, Michigan (AP-1; UPI-1)
 Rod Woodson, Purdue (AP-1; UPI-1)
 Jay Norvell, Iowa (AP-1)
 Phil Parker, Michigan State (UPI-1)
 Garland Rivers, Michigan (AP-2; UPI-2)
 Craig Swoope, Illinois (AP-2; UPI-2)
 Devon Mitchell, Iowa (AP-2)
 Terry White, Ohio State (UPI-2)

Special teams

Kickers
 Chris White, Illinois (AP-2; UPI-1)
 Rob Houghtlin, Iowa (AP-1)
 Rich Spangler, Ohio State (UPI-2)

Punters
 Greg Montgomery, Michigan State (AP-1; UPI-2)
 Tom Tupa, Ohio State (AP-2; UPI-1)

Key
AP = Associated Press, selected by a panel of 20 sports writers and broadcasters covering the Big Ten

UPI = United Press International, selected by the conference coaches

Bold = Consensus first-team selection of both the AP and UPI

See also
1985 College Football All-America Team

References

All-Big Ten Conference
All-Big Ten Conference football teams